The 2021–22 UEFA Youth League knockout phase began on 8 February 2022 with the play-off round and ended with the final on 25 April 2022 at Colovray Stadium in Nyon, Switzerland, to decide the champions of the 2021–22 UEFA Youth League. All matches were played across 90 minutes and penalty shoot-out if necessary.

Times are CET/CEST.

Qualified teams

Domestic Champions Path

Schedule

Bracket

Play-offs

Summary

The eight second round winners from the Domestic Champions Path were drawn against the eight group runners-up from the UEFA Champions League Path, with the teams from the Domestic Champions Path hosting the match. Teams from the same association could not be drawn against each other.

The draw was conducted on 14 December 2021 12:00 CET at the UEFA headquarters in Nyon. The play-offs were played over one leg on 8 and 9 February 2022.

|}

Matches

Round of 16

Summary

The draw was conducted on 14 February 2022 12:00 CET at the UEFA headquarters in Nyon. The round of 16 should have been played over one leg on 1 and 2 March 2022. The mechanism of the draws for each round was as follows:
In the draw for the round of 16, the UEFA Champions League Path group winners were drawn against the play-off winners, with the first team drawn in each tie hosting the match. Teams from the same UEFA Champions League Path group could not be drawn against each other, but teams from the same association could be drawn against each other.
In the draws for the quarter-finals onwards, there were no seedings, and teams from the same UEFA Champions League Path group or the same association could be drawn against each other (the identity of the quarter-final winners and onwards was not known at the time of the draws). The draws also decided the home team for each quarter-final, and which quarter-final and semi-final winners were designated as the "home" team for each semi-final and final (for administrative purposes as they were played at a neutral venue).

|}

Matches

Quarter-finals

Summary

The draw was conducted on 14 February 2022 12:00 CET at the UEFA headquarters in Nyon. The quarter-finals were played over one leg from 15 March to 13 April 2022.

|}

Matches

Semi-finals

Summary

The draw was conducted on 14 February 2022 12:00 CET at the UEFA headquarters in Nyon. The semi-finals were played over one leg on 22 April 2022 at Colovray Stadium, Nyon.

|}

Matches

Final

The draw was conducted on 14 February 2022 12:00 CET at the UEFA headquarters in Nyon. The final was played on 25 April 2022 at Colovray Stadium, Nyon.

This was a replay of the 2017 UEFA Youth League Final, which Salzburg won 2–1. Benfica won 6–0 to win their first Youth League title, and their first title in European football since the 1961–62 European Cup.

Notes

References

External links

UEFA Youth League Matches: 2021–22, UEFA.com

3
February 2022 sports events in Europe
March 2022 sports events in Europe
April 2022 sports events in Europe